Miguel Adolfo Cubas Contreras (born December 2, 1964 in Caracas, Venezuela) is a well known Venezuelan actor.

Biography 
Miguel Adolfo Cubas Contreras was born on December 2, 1964 in Caracas, Venezuela. He grew up in a conservative family. Cubas wanted to become a priest and he attended a Catholic seminar school with that purpose in mind, but he left the school after two years. He has admitted that later on as a teenager, he attempted to commit suicide.

Personal life 
Adolfo Cubas has a daughter who was born in 1987. Adolfo Cubas divorced in 1998. In 2005, a brain tumor was removed that nearly ended his life. Once recovered, he had to endure criticism for having publicly thanked the former president Hugo Chávez for his help because the insurance did not cover the intervention and he could not pay for it, being Chávez the one who had him operated at the Hospital Militar Dr. Carlos Arvelo. In 2010, he had a controversy for having had a relationship with Ricky Martin. On May 18, 2013 he became the godfather of a girl named Roiderlyn Martínez.

Career 
Adolfo Cubas started to become involved in the entertainment world when he met and made a friendship with members of Los Chamos, a famous 1980s boy band. Cubas led Carlos Baute to become involved in Los Chamos. Cubas also became a friend of Menudo's Ricky Martin. From 1984 to 1987, Cubas himself became a member of Los Chamos. In 1987, Cubas made his telenovela debut, participating in Mi amada Beatriz. From 1988 to 1989, he was part of the cast of the television series Abigail. Cubas participated in two other telenovelas before he joined Guillermo Dávila and Sonya Smith in 1992's Cara Sucia one of Venevision's most famous telenovelas of all time. He shaved his head and has participated in seventeen other film productions since. Cubas participated in a Playboy Channel Latino production which was recorded in Peru.

Filmography

Television

Movies

Television Programs

References

External links

Adolfo Cubas in Ultimas Noticias
Adolfo Cubas in VenCOR

Living people
RCTV personalities
Venezuelan male telenovela actors
1964 births